Coleophora tuvensis is a moth of the family Coleophoridae. It is found in the Tuva Republic in Russia.

References

tuvensis
Moths of Asia
Moths described in 1977